Jan Paul van Aken (born 1 May 1961) is a German biologist and a politician (The Left Party). He was member of German Bundestag from 2009 to 2017.

He is a member of the Foreign Affairs Committee and the Subcommittee on Disarmament, Arms Control and Non-Proliferation in the German Bundestag. Jan van Aken entered the 17th Bundestag in 2009 after he was listed on the Left electoral lists in Hamburg. From 2009 until 2011 Jan van Aken was the deputy chairperson for the parliamentary faction of the Left.

Biography
After completing his Abitur in 1982, van Aken studied biology at the University of Hamburg. During this time, he also participated in the Anti-nuclear movement. After completing his Diploma in biology in 1989 and he got an Ph.D. in 1993. He worked as a scientist at the University of Hamburg. From 1997 to 2009 he was the resident expert on genetic engineering for the environmental organization Greenpeace. Also during this time, from 2004 until 2006, he worked as a biological weapons inspector for the United Nations. His long-standing interest in biological warfare agents had already led him in 1999 to call for their banning as part of the Sunshine Project, which was followed by the establishment of a research institute with similar objectives in 2003. After his return to Hamburg as part of his work with the UN, he joined the Left Party and became, only three years later, the lead candidate of the party in Hamburg during the 2009 German Federal election.

Jan van Aken was ordered in April 2013 by the Lüneburg District Court to pay a fine of €2,250 for a "public provocation to commit a crime" because he signed the "Castor, schottern" petition calling for the sabotage of railroads in protest against the transport of nuclear waste.

From 2009 until 2011 Jan van Aken was the deputy chairperson for the parliamentary faction of the Left Party in the Bundestag, and since 2012, he has been their foreign policy spokesperson. He has since stepped down in 2017.

Since he had quit his role as MoP, Jan van Aken is working at the Geneva office of the Rosa Luxemburg Foundation as part of the global health programme.

External links 

 Profile on the Bundestag homepage
 Personal Homepage
 Profile on Representative Watch website
 Profile on the Left website

References

1961 births
Living people
Members of the Bundestag for Hamburg
University of Hamburg alumni
People from Stormarn (district)
People associated with Greenpeace
Members of the Bundestag 2013–2017
Members of the Bundestag 2009–2013
Members of the Bundestag for The Left